Pharma may be an abbreviation for:

Drugs
 Pharmaceutical drug
 Pharmaceutical industry
 Pharmaceutical Research and Manufacturers of America (PhRMA)
 Pharmacology

Arts, entertainment, and media
 Pharma (album) a 2017 album by vaporwave producer Nmesh
 Pharma (film), a 2006 film written by Ben Sainsbury and directed by Mark Thoburn